The Battle of the Litani River (9 June 1941) was a battle of the Second World War that took place on the advance to Beirut during the Syria-Lebanon campaign. The Australian 7th Division, commanded by Major-General John Lavarack, crossed the Litani River and later clashed with Vichy French troops.

Battle
During the first hour of 8 June 1941, as part of Operation Exporter, Australian forces in northern Palestine crossed the border into southern Lebanon.  Initial resistance from Vichy forces south of the Litani River was scattered and generally disorganised.

The 21st Australian Brigade advanced along the coast road heading for Beirut and attempted to cross the Litani River. A surprise night time landing by the British No. 11 (Scottish) Commando, under the command of Lieutenant Colonel R.L. Pedder (Highland Light Infantry), was attempted in order to seize the bridge near the mouth of the river, but was delayed by rough seas on the proposed landing beach. This gave the Vichy French defenders enough time to destroy the bridge. When the commandos eventually landed in daylight, in three separate places, the initial landing was almost unopposed due to the defenders being in combat against the Australian troops, subsequently in the fighting they took heavy casualties, among them Pedder, who was killed in an assault on the French barracks. He was succeeded in command by Geoffrey Keyes, whose party was ultimately able to secure the crossing by getting over the river in canvas boats with the help of some of the Australian troops.

A Vichy counterattack using armoured cars was driven off. A pontoon bridge was quickly completed. The Australians came under inaccurate fire from two Vichy French destroyers, the Guépard and the Valmy.  Australian artillery had to drive off the warships which had come close inshore to shell the advancing troops.

Aftermath
Following the fighting around the Litani, the 21st Brigade advanced north towards Tyre, as part of the wider move towards Beirut. From Tyre, several minor actions were fought as part of the drive to capture Sidon, which fell on 13 June. Further inland, on the 21st Brigade's right flank, the 25th Brigade advanced towards Merdjayoun, which was temporarily secured on 11 June. A small force from the 25th was subsequently left to hold Merdjayoun, while the remainder was sent north to capture Jezzine, which also fell on 13 June. However, on 15 June, a heavy counterattack fell on Merdjayoun, and heavy fighting followed until 27 June.

See also
 Layforce

Notes

References 

 

Conflicts in 1941
1941 in France
Military battles of Vichy France
Syria–Lebanon campaign
Battles of World War II involving Australia
World War II British Commando raids
June 1941 events